

B 

B 9273
B-A-C
B-Caro-T
B2036-PEG

Bab-Bal 

Baby Gasz
Bacampicillin (INN)
Baci-IM
Baci-Rx
Bacid
Baciguent
Baciim
Bacitracin (INN)
Baclofen (INN)
Bacmecillinam (INN)
Bactocill
BactoShield
Bactrim
Bactroban
Bafetinib (USAN, INN)
Bakeprofen (INN)
Baker's P S
Bal
Balamapimod (USAN, INN)
Balapiravir (USAN, INN)
Balazipone (INN)
Baldex
Balicatib (INN)
Balneol-HC
Balnetar
Balofloxacin (INN)
Balsalazide (INN)
Balziva

Bam-Bas 

Bamaluzole (INN)
Bamaquimast (INN)
Bamate
Bambermycin (INN)
Bambuterol (INN)
Bamethan (INN)
Bamifylline (INN)
Baminercept (USAN, INN)
Bamipine (INN)
Bamnidazole (INN)
Banan
Bancap HC
Bancap
Banophen
Banthine
Bantron
Bapineuzumab (USAN, (INN))
Baquiloprim (INN)
Bar-Test
Barasertib (INN)
Barbexaclone (INN)
Barbidonna
Barbita
Barbital sodium (INN)
Barbital (INN)
Barc Liquid
Bardoxolone (USAN, INN)
Baricon
Barixibat (INN)
Barmastine (INN)
Barnidipine (INN)
Baro-CAT
Barobag
Baroflave
Baros. Redirects to Intravenous sodium bicarbonate.
Barosperse
Barstatin 100
Barucainide (INN)
Barusiban (INN)
Basaljel
Basifungin (INN)
Basiliximab (INN)

Bat-Baz 

Batabulin (USAN)
Batanopride (INN)
Batebulast (INN)
Batelapine (INN)
Batilol (INN)
Batimastat (INN)
Batoprazine (INN)
Batroxobin (INN)
Bavisant (INN, (USAN)
Bavituximab (USAN, INN)
Baxitozine (INN)
Baycol
BayGam
BayHep B
Baypress
BayRab
BayTet
Baza Antifungal
Bazedoxifene (USAN)
Bazinaprine (INN)

Bc 

BCNU